This list of airports in Brunei contains all airports in the Sultanate of Brunei Darussalam.

Airports

See also
Transport in Brunei
List of airports by ICAO code: W#WB - Brunei and Malaysia
Wikipedia:WikiProject Aviation/Airline destination lists: Asia#Brunei Darussalam

References

External links

Ministry of Transport and Infocommunications (MTIC), Brunei Darussalam — at MTIC.GOV.BN
Ministry of Transport and Infocommunications (MTIC) – directory — parent to the Department of Civil Aviation (DCA), at GOV.BN
Civil Aviation Order, 2006 — at MTIC.GOV.BN
Civil Aviation Regulations, 2006 — at MTIC.GOV.BN

Great Circle Mapper: Brunei

 
Brunei
Airports
Airports
Brunei